Bartolomeudiasiella is a genus of horse flies in the family Tabanidae.

Distribution
Namibia.

Species
Bartolomeudiasiella atlanticus Dias, 1987

References

Tabanidae
Tabanoidea genera
Diptera of Africa